The Fimer was an Italian automobile manufactured from 1948 until 1949.  One of many mini-cars built in the years following World War II, it had a 246 cc two-stroke rear-mounted motorcycle engine; few were constructed.

References
David Burgess Wise, The New Illustrated Encyclopedia of Automobiles.

Defunct motor vehicle manufacturers of Italy